Mahaan Hutatma is a 2018 Kannada-language short film directed by Sagar Puranik and produced by Akshay Chandrashekhar, under the banners of Akshay Entertainment in Associate with Puranik Productions. Starring Akshay Chandrashekhar, Sagar Puranik, Adhvithi Shetty and Srinath, It is the first Kannada-language short film to win National Film Award – Special Mention for a non-feature film.

Plot
“Mahaan Hutatma” the national award-winning short film directly translating into “The Great Martyr” is a dedication to the martyred freedom fighters and the Indian Army for their selfless sacrifice. It's about the elders who pass the story of our brave freedom fighter Bhagat Singh to the next generation. The movie is about how Bhagat Singh and his team who fought with British for the freedom, what all they had to face, how they got tortured from the British Authorities. It's about how our Brave Soldiers sacrifice, what they are facing on the border. It's about the families of our soldiers. What our soldier's families face when they get the news of their soldiers death.

Cast
 Akshay Chandrashekhar
 Sagar Puranik
 Adhvithi Shetty
 Pranayaraja Srinath
 Achintya Puranik
 Varun Srinivas
 Kuldeep
 Manoj
 Shashi Kumar
 Peter Grabinski

References

External links

2018 films
2018 short films
Indian short films
2018 directorial debut films
2010s Kannada-language films